Larry Greene may refer to:

Larry Greene (baseball), Philadelphia Phillies first-round draft pick in 2011
Larry Greene (musician), musician in Fortune
Larry Greene, owner of KDXX
Larry Greene, a Beacon Hill character played by Peter Coffield

See also
Larry Green (disambiguation)
Lawrence Green (disambiguation)
Laurence Green (disambiguation)